The Big 12 Conference baseball tournament (sometimes known simply as the Big 12 tournament) is the conference championship tournament in baseball for the Big 12 Conference.  Going back to the original format abandoned in 2005, the tournament consists of two separate four-team double-elimination tournaments. The winners of each of those tournament face each other in a one-game match for the championship.  The winner receives the conference's automatic bid to the NCAA Division I baseball tournament.

History
The Big 12 tournament was first played in 1997 at All Sports Stadium in Oklahoma City, before moving to Chickasaw Bricktown Ballpark the following year. The tournament has been played in Oklahoma City each year, save for 2002 and 2004, when the event was played in Arlington, Texas, at the home park of Major League Baseball's Texas Rangers.  Over its 10-plus year history, the tournament has had three distinct formats.

1997–98

In 1997 and 1998, the top six teams were invited to play in a double elimination tournament with no byes for any teams. The format mirrored the regional round of the NCAA tournament at that time.

1999–2005

Beginning in 1999, the tournament expanded to eight teams and followed the format of the College World Series. It consisted of two 4-team double-elimination brackets, with the winners facing off in a final championship game. The format mirrors that of the tournament format used by the Southeastern Conference, which continues to use this bracket.

2006–2010

In 2006 the tournament moved to a round-robin format. In this format, two pools of four teams play each other with the winners of each pool playing a one-game championship match.  This format ended in 2010.

2011–present
Starting with the 2011 Big 12 Conference baseball tournament, the tournament went back to the format used from 1999 to 2005.

Champions

By school

(As of the end of the 2017 tournament)
Italics indicate that the program no longer sponsors baseball in the Big 12.
Former Big 12 member Colorado did not sponsor baseball after 1980

Records
Team batting

Team fielding

Team pitching

Individual batting

Individual fielding

Individual pitching

See also
 List of Big 12 Conference champions
 Southwest Conference baseball tournament
Baseball awards#U.S. college baseball

References

 2007 Big 12 Tournament media guide

External links
Official website